Stromatinia is a genus of fungi in the family Sclerotiniaceae.

References

External links
Index Fungorum

Sclerotiniaceae
Taxa named by Jean Louis Émile Boudier